This page shows the progress of Southend United F.C. in the 2011–12 football season. During this campaign, they played their games in the fourth tier of English football, League Two.

League data

League table

League Two results round by round

Squad statistics

Appearances and goals

|-
|colspan="14"|Players released

|-
|colspan="14"|Players featured this season for Southend United on loan before returning to parent club:

|-
|}

Top scorers

Disciplinary record

Results

Pre-season friendlies

League Two

League Two play-offs

FA Cup

League Cup

Football League Trophy

Transfers

References

Southend United F.C. seasons
Southend United